Alexander John Grant (1693 – 19 September 1727) was a Roman Catholic clergyman who briefly served as the vicar apostolic of the Highland District, Scotland.

Educated at the Scots College in Rome, he was appointed the first vicar apostolic of the Highland District and titular bishop of Sura by the Holy See on 16 September 1727. However, Father Grant died on 19 September 1727, without being consecrated a bishop.

References 

1693 births
1727 deaths
Apostolic vicars of Scotland
18th-century Roman Catholic bishops in Scotland
Year of birth unknown